Arthur Leroy "Buddy" Carpenter (November 10, 1894 – July 1973), born "Arthur Leroy Washington", was an American Negro league second baseman in the 1920s.

A native of Harrisburg, Pennsylvania, Carpenter played for the Harrisburg Giants in 1922. He died in Harrisburg in 1973 at age 78.

References

External links
Baseball statistics and player information from Baseball-Reference Black Baseball Stats and Seamheads

1894 births
1973 deaths
Date of death missing
Harrisburg Giants players
20th-century African-American sportspeople